Mercaz HaRav (officially, "The Center of Rabbi [Kook] - the Central Universal Yeshiva") is a national-religious yeshiva in Jerusalem, founded in 1924 by Ashkenazi Chief Rabbi Abraham Isaac Kook. Located in the city's Kiryat Moshe neighborhood, it has become the most prominent religious-Zionist yeshiva in the world and synonymous with Rabbi Kook's teachings. Many Religious Zionist educators and leaders have studied at Mercaz HaRav, where hundreds of future militants, opposed to territorial compromises and promoting Israeli settlement of the occupied Palestinian territories, received their formative education.

Name

The yeshiva's official name is The Central Universal Yeshiva, indicating its role in Rabbi Kook's vision as a central institution for the spiritual revitalization of the Jewish people. Kook, however, lacked the financial backing necessary to establish a full-fledged academic institution. 
The yeshiva grew out of an evening program for young scholars who gathered to hear the recently appointed Chief Rabbi of Jerusalem lecture in Halakhah and Aggadah. Rabbi Yitchak Levi, a disciple of Rabbi Kook from his years in Jaffa, initiated this evening program in 1920, calling it Mercaz HaRav - "the Rabbi’s Center." 
 In a public letter from 1923, Rabbi Kook explained, "In a very small measure compared to the great role of the Universal Yeshiva, I have started leading the small and limited center 'Mercaz HaRav' as the cornerstone to establish the future Universal Yeshiva."
The name "Mercaz HaRav" remained, despite the yeshiva's transformation over the years into one of Israel's largest and most influential yeshivot.

History 

Mercaz HaRav was founded in 1924 by Rabbi Abraham Isaac Kook, the chief Ashkenazi rabbi during the British Mandate for Palestine. It was housed in Beit HaRav, built by the noted American philanthropist Harry Fischel. Rabbi Kook's vision was to create a new yeshiva curriculum, integrating traditional Talmudic studies with Jewish philosophy, Bible, Jewish history, geography, and literature. The last three subjects, however, were never taught there.

In 1925, Rabbi Kook invited the great European scholar  Rabbi Avraham Aharon Borstein (1867–1925) to serve as rosh yeshiva. Tragically, Rabbi Borstein died suddenly at age 58, nine months after taking up his duties.

Kook died in 1935, and his student, Rabbi Yaakov Moshe Charlap, succeeded him as rosh yeshiva. After Charlap's death in 1951, Rabbi Zvi Yehuda Kook, Rabbi Abraham Isaac Kook's son, took up his father's position. In 1982, after Rabbi Zvi Yehuda Kook died, Rabbi Avraham Shapira took the position and led the institution until his death in 2007. His son Rabbi Yaakov Shapira is his successor.

In its first decades, the yeshiva had few students, and its future was in doubt. However, in the 1950s,  graduates of Bnei Akiva religious schools and high-school yeshivas seeking higher religious education entered Mercaz Harav. Bnei Akiva leader Rabbi Moshe Zvi Neria, a disciple of Rabbi Abraham Isaac Kook, encouraged students to go to Mercaz Harav, then headed by Rabbi Zvi Yehuda Kook.

In 1997, Rabbi Zvi Thau strongly opposed the introduction of an academic framework - plans to integrate a teaching institute - into Mercaz HaRav. As a result of the disagreement, he, together with six senior lecturers and many students, left the yeshiva and established the Har Hamor yeshiva.

In 2008, the yeshiva has about 500 students, including 200 students in the yeshiva's kollel (post-graduate division).

Relationship to West Bank settlements 

Zvi Yehuda Kook's fundamentalist teachings as the Rosh Yeshiva of the Mercaz HaRav yeshiva  were a major factor in the formation and activities of the settlement movement in the Israeli-occupied West Bank and Gaza, mainly through his influence on the Gush Emunim movement, which was founded by his students. His student Hanan Porat set out to restore the Jewish settlement in Gush Etzion immediately following the Six-Day War.

Roshei Yeshiva 
 Abraham Isaac Kook, (1924-1935)
 Avraham Aharon Borstein, (1925)
 Yaakov Moshe Charlap, (1935-1951)
 Natan Ra'anan, (lecturer and administrator)(1935-1972)
 Tzvi Yehuda Kook, (1951-1982)
 Shaul Yisraeli, (1982-1995)
 Avraham Shapira, (1982-2007)
 Yaakov Shapira, (2007 to present)

Mercaz HaRav massacre 

On the night of March 6, 2008, a lone shooter from Jabel Mukaber in East Jerusalem, entered the yeshiva with a gun and began firing indiscriminately, murdering eight students and wounding 15 others. The attack ended with the arrival of Yitzhak Dadon, a part-time student of the yeshiva, and David Shapira, an officer in the Israel Defense Forces, who shot and killed the shooter.

Victims

Notable alumni 

The list includes a number of Knesset members, rabbis, and community leaders.

 Roni Alsheikh, head of the Israel Police 
 Rabbi Yaakov Ariel, Chief Rabbi of Ramat Gan
 Rabbi Shlomo Aviner, Rosh Yeshiva of Ateret Yerushalayim yeshiva, rabbi of Bet El
 Rabbi David Bar-Hayim
 Michael Ben-Ari, Knesset member
 Yoel Bin-Nun, one of the founders of Yeshivat Har Etzion 
 Ezriel Carlebach, founder of the Maariv newspaper
 Rabbi Oury Amos Cherki, lecturer and author
 Rabbi Zephaniah Drori, Chief Rabbi of Kiryat Shmona
 Rabbi Haim Druckman, former Knesset member, Rosh Yeshiva of Ohr Etzion Yeshiva
 Rabbi Shmuel Eliyahu, Chief Rabbi of Safed 
 Rabbi Menachem Froman, founding member of Gush Emunim and former rabbi of Tekoa
Daniel Hershkowitz (born 1953), politician, mathematician, rabbi, and president of Bar-Ilan University
 Hillel Kook, Knesset member
 Rabbi Dov Lior, former Chief Rabbi of Hebron and Kiryat Arba
 Moshe Levinger, founder of post-1967 Hebron Jewish community
 Rabbi Eliezer Melamed, rabbi of Har Bracha
 Rabbi Zalman Baruch Melamed, Rosh Yeshiva of Beit El yeshiva
 Rabbi Moshe-Zvi Neria, educator, former Knesset member, Rosh Yeshiva of yeshiva in Kfar Haroeh
 Hanan Porat, educator and Knesset member
 David Raziel, commander of the Irgun 
 Rabbi Haim Sabato, Rosh Yeshiva of Yeshivat Birkat Moshe and author
 Rabbi David Samson, educator
 Rabbi Yitzchak Sheilat, Rosh Yeshiva at Yeshivat Birkat Moshe and Maimonides scholar
 Rabbi Zvi Thau, co-founder and president of Yeshivat Har Hamor
 Michel Warschawski (aka Mikado), left-wing activist and author; co-founder of the Alternative Information Center
 Rabbi Shaul Yisraeli, rabbi of Kfar Haroeh,  Rosh Yeshiva at Mercaz HaRav, President of the Eretz Hemdah Institute

References

Bibliography

External links 

 Official website 
 Official website 

Abraham Isaac Kook
Chardal
Educational institutions established in 1924
Orthodox yeshivas in Jerusalem
Religious Zionist yeshivot
Yeshivot hesder
1924 establishments in Mandatory Palestine